Wu Chao-shu (Traditional Chinese: 伍朝樞; Simplified Chinese: 伍朝枢; 23 May 1887 – 3 January 1934), also known as C.C. Wu, and romanized as Wu Chaoshu, was Foreign Minister of the Republic of China in 1927–8, and was Minister to the United States from 1928 to 1931. He was the son of former Minister to the United States Wu Tingfang and philanthropist Ho Miu-ling.

Wu was born in Tientsin.  He went to Atlantic City High School and was valedictorian there in 1904. He graduated from the University of London in 1911. He was elected a member of the Chinese parliament in 1913. In 1917, he joined Sun Yatsen's Constitution Protection Movement, and in 1918 was made Vice-Minister of Foreign Affairs. He remained in this post until 1923, despite Sun's exile and subsequent return. In 1919 he was China's chief delegate to the Versailles Peace Conference. In March 1923, Wu became Foreign Affairs Minister in Sun's government-in-exile. He became Foreign Minister of the Republic of China under Chiang Kai-shek in 1927. He then served as Minister to the United States from 1928 to 1931, and Representative to the League of Nations in 1929–30. He was the delegate to The Hague Conference for the Modification of International Law in 1930.  He resigned as Minister to the United States in 1931 as a protest against the supply of arms to the Nanking government against the rival Cantonese government.

Wu married Pao Fang-ho, and the couple had eight children. Wu's grandson is US federal judge George H. Wu.

References

1887 births
1934 deaths
Alumni of the University of London
Atlantic City High School alumni
Foreign Ministers of the Republic of China
Republic of China politicians from Tianjin
Ambassadors of the Republic of China to the United States
Permanent Representatives of the Republic of China to the League of Nations
Wu family